Robert Lieberman (born 1947) is a Canadian director.

Robert Lieberman may also refer to:

Robert C. Lieberman (born 1964), American political scientist and academic administrator
Robert H. Lieberman, American novelist